Edward "Ted" Brocklebank (born 24 September 1942) is a Scottish Conservative politician.  He was a Member of the Scottish Parliament (MSP) for the Mid Scotland and Fife from 2003 to 2011.

Career
Brocklebank was previously a journalist and a television producer, having been Head of News and Current Affairs at Grampian Television. He stood for the Fife North East constituency in the 1999 Scottish Parliament election, coming second to Liberal Democrat Iain Smith. This was repeated in the 2003 election, although the Conservatives' share of the vote increased. This time however, Brocklebank was elected through the regional list for Mid Scotland and Fife.

He was the rural affairs spokesman of the Scottish Conservative and Unionist Party, and a member of the party's Shadow Cabinet. In February 2007 he resigned from the Shadow Cabinet after David Cameron changed the party's stance on fisheries, specifically the threat of withdrawal from the EU's Common Fisheries Policy. Mr Brocklebank did not seek re-election at the 2011 Scottish Parliament election.

References

External links 
 
 They Work for You

1942 births
Living people
People from St Andrews
Scottish journalists
Scottish television producers
Members of the Scottish Parliament 2003–2007
Members of the Scottish Parliament 2007–2011
People educated at Madras College
Conservative MSPs